Kanischka Taher (Dari: كانشكا طاهر, born 4 April 1991) is an Afghan professional footballer who plays as a midfielder for Kapellen-Erft and the Afghanistan national football team.

International
Taher played for the Afghanistan U23 side during the 2014 Asian Games. He made his competitive debut for the Afghanistan senior side on 8 September 2015 against Japan. He came on as an 88th-minute substitute as Afghanistan lost 6–0. He scored his first goal for his country on 31 December 2015 in the SAFF Championship against Sri Lanka. His 50th-minute goal helped Afghanistan win 5–0 and advance to final against India.

International goals

Career statistics

References

1991 births
Living people
Footballers from Kabul
Afghan footballers
Afghanistan international footballers
German footballers
Afghan emigrants to Germany
Association football midfielders
Expatriate footballers in Germany
Footballers at the 2014 Asian Games
Asian Games competitors for Afghanistan